The Guyana Civil Aviation Authority (GCAA) is a government agency of Guyana overseeing civil aviation. Its headquarters are in Georgetown. The agency investigates aviation accidents and incidents.

See also

 Caribbean Airlines Flight 523

References

External links
 Guyana Civil Aviation Authority

Government of Guyana
Guyana
Aviation organisations based in Guyana
Organizations investigating aviation accidents and incidents
Civil aviation in Guyana